Tejo, also known, to a lesser degree, as turmequé, is a traditional throwing sport in Colombia. It is characteristic for its use of small targets containing gunpowder, which explode on impact.

History 
There is not one widely accepted theory on the origins of tejo. In fact, it is believed that many of the current theories circulating on the internet might be fictitious and a result of "word of mouth" and speculation.

It is, however, widely accepted that the sport has origins in native aboriginals from the center of Colombia, where it might have been played in a similar form.

Another theory presented by the Colombian government on its website describes the game as having originated more than 500 years ago. In this theory, presented by one of the most important authorities in the country, the sport was played by native people that would use a golden disc called zepguagoscua. This, however, is refuted in other sources as a word with sounds not existent in dictionaries of the Chibcha language.

Cultural background 
Tejo is a sport much appreciated by the popular strata of society. Although there are tejo arenas targeted towards those of a higher socio-economical strata, most of them are made and used by those of the popular class that see it as a portrait of their pre-Colombian origins. Only soccer enjoys a more numerous following and developed industry in the country.

Tejo has professional teams in neighboring countries including Venezuela, Ecuador and Panama. The sport's following and industry are much less developed outside of Colombia.

Gameplay 

Depending on the context, tejo can be played in either a formal or informal sense from collecting points to professional championship tournaments.

The game consists of throwing a metal puck/disc (called a tejo), across an alley at a distance of approximately 18.5 meters (ring to ring), to a one meter by one meter board covered with clay and set at a forty-five degree angle.

The tablas are located at every extreme of the field. The tabla consist of a wooden frame that holds clay and a protective board to keep the tejo from hitting other elements or people in the neighboring area. Inside the frame, there is a metal pipe or car spring strong enough to withstand the continuing impacts of the tejo. This pipe is the target where the tejo is meant to hit. The pipe is set at the same angle as the post's frame (45 degrees).

The tejo must be thrown from within the throwing area, and the goal is to impact the inside of the target at the other extreme. A chief characteristic of the sport is its use of small, exploding targets that contain gunpowder, commonly known as "mechas". These usually triangle-shaped envelopes with explosive material inside are set on the edges of the pipe where on impact with the tejo explode loudly creating a sound similar to the one created by a small revolver upon firing.

Score 
Although scoring can be arbitrary the following format is commonly used:

 Hand: It grants 1 point to the tejo that is closest at the end of a round.
 Hit: It grants 3 points to every player that explodes a mecha.
 Bulls-eye: It grants 6 points to that player whose tejo has impacted inside the target.
 Strike: It grants 9 points to that player that has a hit and a bulls-eye in the same throw.

Pitch 
The pitch or post is usually a wooden box of approximately 90 cm (35 inch) wide and 1 meter (40 inch) long, filled with clay, and either tilted or cut at a 35 to 45 degree angle. The clay used is anything from average mud to modeling clay, depending on the setting of the sport. The tejo gets embedded in the clay upon landing, and depending on the consistency of the clay, the tejo can be easily reached or sometimes it becomes necessary to dig a little bit to find it. This makes the consistency of the clay very important.

The protective board is meant to keep the tejo within the boundaries of the field when the tejo is off target. The size is not standard, but the idea is for it to be proportionately bigger than the pitch itself.

The target is usually a metal pipe cut or set in a way that it won't be easily moved by the impact of the tejo hitting it at a high speed. In most cases, it is either soldered or screwed to the frame.

There are no standards on the construction of the pitch given the traditionalism of the sport.

Modern day tejo 
In Colombia, it is very common to find professional tejo teams around the major cities and smaller towns. A few of the teams are sponsored by local companies or someone that loves tejo. In the past, the playing of tejo was fueled by "Chicha" (an indigenous maize-based alcoholic beverage), but, more recently, the players refresh themselves with beer.

Modern tejo competitions are highly organized tournaments. Tournaments, known as "torneos Relampago," are the most common, usually played in just one weekend by direct elimination of teams. Prizes include trophies, medals, and money. Household items are awarded to finalist in combination with money or coupons. Tejo has no mass media coverage, apart from the National Games, but sponsoring and very targeted marketing efforts make it attractive to brands that position themselves as "popular" since public affluence to the tournaments is numerous.

Tejo has become a popular cultural activity for backpackers travelling Colombia, with a number of hostels throughout the country hosting free tejo nights.

It is also possible to find a version of the sport in which the clay, plasticine, beer and gunpowder have been eliminated, with electronic sensors instead of the traditional "mechas" to detect a hit.

Disputes related to alcohol consumption 
Tejo is a sport that has been widely exploited by beer companies in Colombia. Tejo aficionados are trying to change its image in popular culture from a rowdy bar game (sport of drunks) to a serious sport with a rich history. There are no statistics on how many people consume alcohol while playing tejo.

There are many people in Colombia who are in disagreement with the use of beer in this sport and some Colombians want to prohibit the sponsorship of beer companies.

See also 
 Chaza
 Muisca
 Tejo (Argentina)

External links 
 Tejo: Colombia's National Sport
 Allegorical music to the sport tejo
 Learning Tejo in Colombia

References 

Traditional sports
Sport in Colombia
Sports originating in Colombia
Precision sports
Colombian culture
Muisca
Throwing games